Forgiveness is a 2006 Israeli drama film directed by Udi Aloni, starring Itay Tiran, Clara Khoury, Moni Moshonov, Makram Khoury and Tamara Mansour.

Cast
 Itay Tiran as David Adler
 Clara Khoury as Lila
 Moni Moshonov as Muselmann
 Makram Khoury as Dr. Isaac Shemesh
 Tamara Mansour as Little Girl/Ghost
 Mike Sarne as Henry Adler

Release
The film was released in the United States on 12 September 2008.

Reception
Sara Schieron of Boxoffice Magazine rated the film 2.5 stars out of 5 and wrote that while the film is "tricky and sometimes perplexing", it is "seldom muddled and always sticking its neck out to reach toward some, if manic, exposition of the truths that lie beneath." Film critic Emanuel Levy wrote that while the "subject is nothing less than riveting" and the "honorable intention of the filmmakers is not in doubt" the narrative strategy and technical execution "leave much to be desired". Michelle Orange of The Village Voice wrote that the "broad strokes" are "overlaid with an impressionistic vigor and thematic intricacy that, had the director not succumbed to their extremes—a kind of insular sprawl, creating distance where interiority is the intent—might have elevated the film from its moorings."

Tasha Robinson of The A.V. Club gave the film a rating of "C" and wrote that "Aloni's ideas are solid, but possibly too large and pointed to cram within fragile human flesh." Jeannette Catsoulis of The New York Times wrote that while "the message may be clear", the "execution is a mess." Hannah Brown of The Jerusalem Post rated the film 1 star and wrote that while "the message may be clear", the "execution is a mess."

References

External links
 
 

Israeli drama films
2006 drama films